Ek Khiladi Ek Haseena may refer to:

Ek Khiladi Ek Haseena (film), a 2005 Indian Hindi crime thriller movie.
Ek Khiladi Ek Haseena (TV series), an Indian reality dance series broadcast on Colors channel in 2008